IMTS can refer to:
 Improved Mobile Telephone Service
 International Manufacturing Technology Show
 Intelligent Multimode Transit System, guided buses

See also 
 IMT (disambiguation)